Inter de Grand-Goâve (commonly known as Inter GG or simply Inter) is a professional football club based in Grand-Goâve, Haiti.

References

Football clubs in Haiti
Association football clubs established in 2000
2000 establishments in Haiti
Ouest (department)